"Tears on My Pillow" is a song by American singer Johnny Nash, written by Ernie Smith and produced by Nash and Ken Khouri, It was the sole number-one single in the UK Singles Chart for Nash, spending a single week at the top of the chart in July 1975. Arranged in a reggae style, the song features a spoken recitation in the middle.

This song is not to be confused with the 1958 hit for Little Anthony and the Imperials. Both songs have the words "Tears on my Pillow/ Pain in my Heart".

New Zealand act The Parker Project, covered this song in 1991, reaching No. 1 on the New Zealand chart in June of that year.

Charts

Year-end charts
The Parker Project version

References

1975 singles
UK Singles Chart number-one singles
Irish Singles Chart number-one singles
1975 songs
Number-one singles in New Zealand